Testerep (or Ter Streep) once comprised an island along the Belgian coast. It existed as early as the 10th century. Fishing villages were scattered about, including Ostend and Westende, with Ostend on the far east (Oost-ende: east-end), Westende on the far west (West-ende: west-end), and Middelkerke (literally "middle-church") the middle of the island. Later, canals and dikes were built and the island became connected to the West Flanders mainland.

References 

Former islands
Islands of Belgium
Landforms of West Flanders
Middelkerke
Ostend